Mountain Creek is a ski resort in Vernon Township, Sussex County, New Jersey, United States. It is located on New Jersey Route 94,  from the George Washington Bridge. 

Mountain Creek contains  of land for skiing area, night skiing, snowboarding, and snowmaking activities. The resort also includes a snow tubing park, zip-lines, an alpine coaster, and a seasonal water park that operates from May to September.

Mountain Creek was owned and operated by Intrawest Resorts Holdings, Inc. until May 2010 when it was sold to neighboring Crystal Springs Resort. Crystal Springs then sold the property to a New Jersey family. On May 5, 2017, Mountain Creek filed for Chapter 11 bankruptcy protection. The resort emerged from bankruptcy in August 2019.

History

1965–71: Great Gorge Resort

Great Gorge Resort was founded in McAfee, an unincorporated area of Vernon Township, in 1965 by three families (the Kurlanders, Fitzgeralds, and Bakers) who worked at the now-closed Snow Bowl Ski Resort in Milton, New Jersey. Great Gorge was built on the former Fredericks farm.

Mountain Creek's Bear and South Peaks were the original Great Gorge Resort, with the current South Base Ski Patrol building serving as the Base Lodge. The original lodge was designed by Alexander McIlvaine, who also designed the lodges at Stratton Mountain in Vermont and Squaw Valley in Olympic Valley, California. The World's Fair was held in Flushing, NY in 1964-1965. When the fair closed, the entire contents of the Swiss Pavilion were purchased and were transported to be incorporated into the new lodge at Great Gorge. Great Gorge was the first ski area in the United States to use a jet engine to power their snow making operation's air compressors. The jet engine was purchased from the Curtiss-Wright Company in Fairfield, New Jersey. The jet engine was located in a building in the parking lot across the street from the new lodge.

Skiers Donna Weinbrecht and Jamie Kurlander, who have been inducted into the Sussex County Sports Hall of Fame, skied at Great Gorge.

During the late 1960s and early 1970s, the Great Gorge ski area hosted a summer zoo at the base of the mountain. The ski area also had a ski jump that was used all year long. In the off seasons, Sno-Mats were used on the trails as well as on the jump and landing area. In the winter, the ski jump was covered with snow. Grass skiing demonstrations were also held in the off seasons on the slopes. Ski races were also held on the Sno-Mats.

The New York, Susquehanna and Western Railway operates tracks that abut the back of the Great Gorge South parking lot. For a time in the 1970s there was a seasonal train operated by the railroad which offered skiers a way to the slopes and then returned them home. 

In 1971, Great Gorge North was built on what is now Mountain Creek's Granite Peak, and a connecting trail was cut to connect Great Gorge North and the original resort, was renamed Great Gorge South. A connecting chair lift was also installed - the Sojourn double. Great Gorge North was part of a master plan that included a never-built Olympic ski-jump and training facility.

Plans for the Playboy Club included a casino and gondola from the hotel to the base at Great Gorge North, neither of which were ever built. Gambling casinos were never approved outside of Atlantic City. The hotel hosted many celebrity shows and boxing events. The Playboy Club hotel closed in the 1980s.

In late 1971, Great Gorge was foreclosed by their lender after a number of seasons brought little snow to the resort.

1971–97: Vernon Valley/Great Gorge
In 1968, Vernon Valley Ski Resort opened to the north of Great Gorge. After the foreclosure of Great Gorge South and Great Gorge North, they were sold to Vernon Valley, which merged the three ski areas to form the Vernon Valley/Great Gorge Resort (VVGG).

In 1974, VVGG was purchased by Great American Recreation (GAR), which invested in snowmaking equipment that allowed the new resort to survive seasons with little snow. In 1978, VVGG opened Action Park, a seasonal amusement park with over 75 rides and attractions including 40 water slides, bungee jumping, go-karts, bumper boats and mini golf.

During the 1980s Cobblestone Village, a small shopping and dining village was built. The decade also saw the development of Great Gorge Village, a 1300-unit condo development of what were originally luxury housing units, and the Spa at Great Gorge, a four-star luxury resort and spa complete with an 18-hole golf course and a number of indoor and outdoor swimming pools. VVGG continued to upgrade its skiing operations, installing a number of new lifts, including a triple chairlift in 1981.

In 1989, GAR negotiated a deal with International Broadcasting Corporation (IBC) to sell the Vernon Valley/Great Gorge ski resort for $50 million. IBC backed out of the deal after inspecting the property.

In 1995, GAR filed for bankruptcy. In 1996, only Vernon Valley opened, with Great Gorge North and South closed due to bankruptcy. Before the 1997 season GAR shut down Vernon Valley/Great Gorge and Action, Park.

In 1998, the remaining assets of Great American Recreation were divided and sold. Eugene Mulvihill Sr. retained control of the Great Gorge golf and hotel area of the resort, which was renamed Crystal Springs Resort. The three ski areas and Action Park were sold to Intrawest, a Canadian-based owner and operator of ski resorts.

The 2000s: Mountain Creek under Intrawest

Intrawest renamed its holdings Mountain Creek and began to refurbish the resort. Intrawest removed 11 of the 13 lifts, replacing them with a gondola, known as the Cabriolet, along with two chairlifts and multiple-fix grip chairs. The Great Gorge Lodge was updated and renamed Mountain Creek South Lodge. Intrawest also installed more than 1,600 new snow guns throughout the mountain. The new resort opened in December 1998. Intrawest also began construction on Action Park, removing all the amusement rides except for the Alpine Slide and Bungee Tower, as well as the Motorworld section of the park, and began work on the Waterworld section of the park. The water park reopened as Mountain Creek Waterpark in the summer of 1998.

Intrawest drafted a master plan for the resort, whose centerpiece was an expansive residential and shopping village, a staple of Intrawest resorts, but which never happened. Included in the village plans were a conference center, hotels, condos, townhouses, shops and restaurants. On the mountaintop was to be a golf course surrounded by a hotel and condos. This mountaintop development was scrapped, however, as the land that it was located on was sold by the State of New Jersey to Mountain Creek's previous owners, Great American Recreation, with a deed restriction that stated the land was to be used only for passive recreation, such as fishing, hiking and camping. Intrawest then sold the land back to the state for $7 million and permission to expand skiing on portions of the mountain where it was previously prohibited.

On October 10, 1999, the 31-year-old Vernon base lodge was destroyed in a fire just weeks before the 1999-2000 ski season. A temporary complex of prefabricated tents was quickly constructed in order to continue operations for the upcoming season. The tent complex included a food court, restaurant and bar and numerous rental and retail shops. While Intrawest originally planned to replace the complex after one year, plans for a new base lodge were put on hold for an unspecified reason. The decaying tent complex remained operational for approximately 13 years through the 2010–11 ski season before being replaced by a permanent lodge named the Red Tail Lodge.

In 2002, Mountain Creek opened the first phase of its master-planned resort village, Black Creek Sanctuary, a luxury condo community. In winter 2003 construction began on The Appalachian, a luxury condominium and hotel built on the former parking lot of Vernon base. Parking was moved to the other side of Rt. 94 to the former location of Action Park's amusement ride and bumper boat area. The Appalachian condo/hotel opened for the 2006–07 season.

The Chevy U.S. Snowboarding Grand Prix was held at Mountain Creek in both 2004 and 2005. The centerpiece of this event was Mountain Creek's Superpipe, one of the only superpipes in the east. The Superpipe went quiet after this and has not been used since. For summer 2006 Intrawest opened the Diablo Mountain Bike Park on Vernon Peak, which featured numerous downhill trails serviced by the Cabriolet gondola.

Mountain Creek opened its 2007–08 winter sports season with a few notable changes to the trail map. The eastern side of Vernon Peak, which used to be home to its freestyle terrain park, was converted into intermediate slopes. The entire Mountain Creek South area (South Peak and Bear Peak) was converted to freestyle terrain park. This angered many long-time season pass holders and many did not renew their passes. A special terrain park pass was now needed to use this area of the mountain. All slopes off those peaks are intermediate trails with additional ratings for the kind of freestyle terrain from small to extra large. Additionally, a long intermediate trail off the Granite Peak, called Granite View, was closed. Minor changes were also made in the dining structure, including replacement of the one-time-use rental lockers with a more compact bag-check station.  In addition, a helipad was located in the rear of the Mountain Creek South parking lot (from the inception of the resort when it was Great Gorge) where people with life-threatening injuries are airlifted to the regional emergency medical centers.

In 2008 Intrawest representatives stated that during the previous two years Intrawest and the resort industry in general experienced a significant softening of the real estate market, which included Mountain Creek, and Intrawest could not commit to completing the village. The Intrawest / Fortress Investments Co. filed for bankruptcy protection and sold off many of the resorts that it owned. The Mountain Creek Resort was sold and became part of the Crystal Springs Resort.

2010: Mountain Creek becomes part of Crystal Springs Resort
Intrawest sold Mountain Creek to the adjacent Crystal Springs Resort in May 2010, returning the entire resort to its previous ownership. The new owners immediately went to work on improving the mountain, replacing the tent complex at Vernon with a new lodge that opened in time for the 2011-12 ski season.  A three-story building, it contains new offices, bars, fine dining restaurant, food court, rental and locker facilities and an outdoor patio.

In summer 2012, Mountain Creek continued improvement plans, opening a new zip line course at the mountaintop lake above Vernon Peak and an Alpine coaster on the lower mountainside near the waterpark. For that winter the resort expanded and relocated its tubing park across the street, renaming it the Dropzone. The Diablo Mountain Bike Park was also transferred to company control and renamed Mountain Creek Bike Park.

In 2010 Sojourn Double, the chairlift that transported people from South to Granite Peak, was retired after 40 years of service. A new fixed-grip double chairlift was installed and opened in time for the 2012–13 season. The new lift has replaced plans for a new trail that would have connected the South peak to Granite Peak, since they realized when working to build the new trail that the topography of the mountain does not go in that direction.

2015: Mountain Creek changes hands again
HSK-MC, a partner in a group that purchased Mountain Creek in 2010, bought out the rights, which made it the sole owner of the Mountain Creek properties. Since the Koffman family (which controls HSK-MC) already was a partial owner of the property, it is said that normal operations will continue. However, the fate of the indoor water park is now in question, since that was planned under Mulvihill's control of the property.

Mountain Statistics

Trails
43 trails.
7 beginner trails
24 intermediate trails (14 of which are terrain park trails)
8 advanced trails (4 of which are terrain park trails)

Lifts
 Mountain Creek has 7 chairlifts, and 2 magic carpets.

See also 
 Mountain Creek Waterpark

References

External links
 Mountain Creek

Geography of Sussex County, New Jersey
Ski areas and resorts in New Jersey
Sports venues in New Jersey
Buildings and structures in Sussex County, New Jersey
Vernon Township, New Jersey
Tourist attractions in Sussex County, New Jersey